In geometry, the Hessian polyhedron is a regular complex polyhedron 3{3}3{3}3, in .  It has 27 vertices, 72 3{} edges, and 27 3{3}3 faces. It is self-dual. 

Coxeter named it after Ludwig Otto Hesse for sharing the Hessian configuration  or (94123), 9 points  lying by threes on twelve lines, with four lines through each point.

It has 24 order-3 reflections. Its Coxeter number is 12, with degrees of the fundamental invariants 3, 6, and 12, which can be seen in projective symmetry of the polytopes.

The Witting polytope, 3{3}3{3}3{3}3,  contains the Hessian polyhedron as cells and vertex figures.

It has a real representation as the 221 polytope, in 6-dimensional space, sharing the same 27 vertices. The 216 edges in 221 can be seen as the 72 3{} edges represented as 3 simple edges.

Coordinates
Its 27 vertices can be given coordinates in :  for (λ, μ = 0,1,2).
(0,ωλ,−ωμ)
 (−ωμ,0,ωλ)
 (ωλ,−ωμ,0) 

where .

As a Configuration

The configuration matrix for 3{3}3{3}3 is:

The number of k-face elements (f-vectors) can be read down the diagonal. The number of elements of each k-face are in rows below the diagonal. The number of elements of each k-figure are in rows above the diagonal.

Images

These are 8 symmetric orthographic projections, some with overlapping vertices, shown by colors. Here the 72 triangular edges are drawn as 3-separate edges.

Related complex polyhedra

This double Hessian polyhedron has 54 vertices, 216 simple edges, and 72  faces. Its vertices represent the union of the vertices  and its dual .

It has 24 order-3 reflections and 9 order-2 reflections. Its coxeter number is 18, with degrees of the fundamental invariants 6, 12, and 18 which can be seen in projective symmetry of the polytopes.

The Hessian is analogous to the tetrahedron, like the cube is a double tetrahedron, and the octahedron as a rectified tetrahedron. In both sets the vertices of the first belong to two dual pairs of the second, and the vertices of the third are at the center of the edges of the second. 

Its vertices can also be seen in the dual polytope of 122.

Construction

The elements can be seen in a configuration matrix:

Images

Rectified Hessian polyhedron

The rectification,  doubles in symmetry as a regular complex polyhedron  with 72 vertices, 216 3{} edges, 54 3{3}3 faces. Its vertex figure is 3{4}2, and van oss polygon 3{4}3. It is dual to the double Hessian polyhedron.

It has a real representation as the 122 polytope, sharing the 72 vertices. Its 216 3-edges can be drawn as 648 simple edges, which is 72 less than 122's 720 edges.

Construction
The elements can be seen in two configuration matrices, a regular and quasiregular form.

References

 Coxeter, H. S. M. and Moser, W. O. J.; Generators and Relations for Discrete Groups (1965), esp pp 67–80.
 Coxeter, H. S. M.; Regular Complex Polytopes, Cambridge University Press, (1974).
 Coxeter, H. S. M. and Shephard, G.C.; Portraits of a family of complex polytopes, Leonardo Vol 25, No 3/4, (1992), pp 239–244,

Polytopes
Complex analysis